The 2006 Kent State Golden Flashes football team represented the Kent State University during the 2006 NCAA Division I FBS football season. Kent State competed as a member of the Mid-American Conference (MAC), and played their home games at Dix Stadium. The Golden Flashes were led by third-year head coach Doug Martin.

Schedule

References

Kent State
Kent State Golden Flashes football seasons
Kent State Golden Flashes football